V1054 Ophiuchi, together with the star Gliese 643, is a nearby quintuple star system, in the constellation Ophiuchus at a distance of 21.19 light-years. It consists of five stars, all of which are red dwarfs. The alternative designation of Wolf 630 forms the namesake of a moving group of stars that share a similar motion through space.

Overview
V1054 Ophiuchi/Gliese 643 has the largest number of stars of all star systems located within 10 pc from Earth. It is also the nearest quintuple star system (the next nearest star systems with at least five stars are GJ 2069 (quintuple) at 41.8 light-years, and  Castor (sextuple) at 51.6 light-years), and the only quintuple star system within 10 pc.

The system consists of three widely separated parts:

close triple subsystem V1054 Ophiuchi A-Bab (including very close binary subsystem V1054 Ophiuchi Bab)
Gliese 643
V1054 Ophiuchi C (vB 8)

Hierarchy of the system:

The brightest and most massive of these five stars is V1054 Ophiuchi A. The close binary subsystem V1054 Ophiuchi B is more massive than V1054 Ophiuchi A, however, its total visual magnitude is 0.1 mag fainter than V1054 Ophiuchi A's visual magnitude.

The total apparent magnitude of the V1054 Ophiuchi A-Bab triple subsystem is 9.02.

Despite V1054 Ophiuchi/Gliese 643 consisting of low-mass stars, the system's total mass, due to the large number of components, exceeds the Solar mass, (it is about ).

Distance
Currently, the most accurate distance estimate of V1054 Ophiuchi/Gliese 643 (apart from weighted mean distance, see below) is a trigonometric parallax of V1054 Ophiuchi AB  from Gaia EDR3, published in 2020:  mas, corresponding to a distance of  pc, or  ly.

Past V1054 Ophiuchi/Gliese 643 distance estimates

V1054 Ophiuchi A-Bab:

Gliese 643:

V1054 Ophiuchi C (vB 8):

Weighted mean distance

Weighted mean parallax, considering YPC (V1054 Ophiuchi A-Bab and Gliese 643), Hipparcos (Soederhjelm — V1054 Ophiuchi A-Bab and van Leeuwen — Gliese 643) and CTIOPI (V1054 Ophiuchi C) data, is 154.96 ± 0.52 mas, corresponding to a distance 6.453 ± 0.022 pc, or 21.05 ± 0.07 ly.

V1054 Ophiuchi A-Bab (inner triple subsystem)
V1054 Ophiuchi A-Bab is a close spectroscopic triple subsystem, consisting of the brighter component V1054 Ophiuchi A and the more massive binary subsystem V1054 Ophiuchi Bab, orbiting each other with a period of 627 days, or 1.72 years. V1054 Ophiuchi Bab components are orbiting each other with a period of 2.9655 days. Both outer and inner orbits are nearly circular and, probably, coplanar (in
keeping with a general tendency of close triple systems).

V1054 Ophiuchi A-Bab pair is also visually resolved (for nearly 50 years it was the shortest-period resolved by visual means binary, since its binarity was discovered by G. P. Kuiper in 1934), whereas V1054 Ophiuchi Ba-Bb pair is still unresolved).

Distant components

Gliese 643
The projected separation of Gliese 643 from V1054 Ophiuchi A-Bab is 72 arcsec, corresponding at 21.05 light-years to 465 a.u.

V1054 Ophiuchi C (vB 8)
vB 8 is the smallest, faintest, and most separated component of the V1054 Ophiuchi system. The projected separation of the red dwarf from the primary triple system is about 220 arcsec, corresponding at 21.05 light-years to 1420 a.u. Since it is only three times larger than the projected separation between Gliese 643 and V1054 Ophiuchi A-Bab, and such a small ratio should render the triple system dynamically unstable, it was suggested that the real separation of V1054 Ophiuchi C from V1054 Ophiuchi A-Bab is much larger, at least by a factor of two, i. e. at least 2840 a.u.

In 1984, the apparent detection of an infrared source near vB 8 suggested it had a low mass companion. The low mass of this candidate led to speculation that it may be a brown dwarf; the first such to be detected. This discovery was later found to be spurious, but it produced much interest in this class of astronomical object.

Notes

References

Ophiuchus (constellation)
5
M-type main-sequence stars
0644
Ophiuchi, V1054
152751
082817
Durchmusterung objects